Ronald Bautista Moreno (born 23 January 1970)  is a Filipino judge who is currently serving as Associate Justice of the Sandiganbayan. He succeeded Justice Alexander Gesmundo who was appointed Associate Justice of the Supreme Court of the Philippines.

References

1970 births
Living people
University of Santo Tomas alumni
Justices of the Sandiganbayan

Filipino judges